The UWA World Featherweight Championship (Campeonato Mundial peso Pluma de UWA in Spanish) was a professional wrestling championship promoted by the Mexican wrestling promotion Universal Wrestling Association (UWA) from 1983 until the promotion closed in 1995.

As it was a professional wrestling championship, the championship was not won not by actual competition, but by a scripted ending to a match determined by the bookers and match makers. On occasion the promotion declares a championship vacant, which means there is no champion at that point in time. This can either be due to a storyline, or real life issues such as a champion suffering an injury being unable to defend the championship, or leaving the company.

Title history

Footnotes

References

External links
UWA Featherweight Title history at:
Wrestling-titles.com
Cagematch.net
Solie.org

Featherweight wrestling championships
Universal Wrestling Association championships
World professional wrestling championships